Pink fairy can refer to one of the following:
 Absinthe colored pink by rose or hibiscus flowers (in contrast with Green Fairy).
 Pink fairy armadillo
 The plant Caladenia latifolia
 The rock band Pink Fairies